The ARIA Digital Track Chart ranks the highest selling legally downloaded music tracks within Australia and is provided by the Australian Recording Industry Association.

History
The Digital Track Chart was established in 2006 and first published on 9 April. Later that year in October it was announced that the sales from physical singles and digital downloads would be integrated with the official Top 100 singles chart which commenced on 8 October. In order for the digital singles to chart on the Top 100 there had to be a physical single release first but in 2007 it was announced that a single would chart on the Top 100 regardless of whether a physical single or a digital single was released first or not.
The chart still runs weekly  but Subscription is required for this chart.

See also
ARIA Digital Album Chart

References

Australian record charts